The following is a list of ecoregions in Mongolia, according to the Worldwide Fund for Nature (WWF):

Terrestrial

Temperate coniferous forests
 Altai montane forest and forest steppe (China, Khazakhstan, Mongolia, Russia)
 Khangai Mountains conifer forests (Mongolia)
 Sayan montane conifer forests (Mongolia, Russia)

Boreal forests/taiga
 Trans-Baikal conifer forests (Mongolia, Russia)

Temperate grasslands, savannas and shrublands
 Daurian forest steppe (China, Mongolia, Russia)
 Mongolian–Manchurian grassland (China, Mongolia, Russia)
 Sayan Intermontane steppe (Russia, Mongolia)
 Selenge–Orkhon forest steppe (Mongolia, Russia)

Montane grasslands and shrublands
 Altai alpine meadow and tundra (China, Kazakhstan, Mongolia, Russia)
 Khangai Mountains alpine meadow (Mongolia)
 Sayan alpine meadows and tundra (Mongolia, Russia)

Deserts and xeric shrublands
 Alashan Plateau semi-desert (Mongolia, China)
 Eastern Gobi desert steppe (Mongolia, China)  
 Gobi Lakes Valley desert steppe (Mongolia, China)
 Great Lakes Basin desert steppe (Mongolia, Russia)
 Junggar Basin semi-desert (China, Mongolia, Khazakhstan)

 
Mongolia
Ecoregions